A number of steamships have been named Baltonia, including:-

, a United Baltic Corporation cargo ship in service 1926-36
, a United Baltic Corporation cargo ship in service 1936-43
, a United Baltic Corporation cargo ship in service 1947-52